Vanessa Sperandio is a professor at the UT Southwestern Medical Center in both the departments of microbiology and biochemistry. She will join the University of Wisconsin School of Medicine and Public Health as the chair of the Department of Medical Microbiology and Immunology in spring 2022.

Research 
Sperandio's research focuses on the signaling mechanisms between mammalian hosts, their beneficial microbiota, and bacterial pathogens.

Awards 
Sperandio was a 1997 fellow of the Pew Charitable Trust and was elected to the American Academy of Microbiology in 2013. She is also a Kavli Frontiers of Science Fellow by the National Academy of Sciences and selected as a Burroughs Wellcome Fund Investigator in the Pathogenesis of Infectious Diseases.

References 

American microbiologists
Women microbiologists
1970 births
Living people